The UCF Orlando Jazz Festival is an annual jazz event hosted at the University of Central Florida founded in 2008 to bring world-class jazz to Orlando, Florida, and has appeared twice on Jazz Set, a program hosted by Dee Dee Bridgewater that appears on Sirius/XM Radio and NPR.  It is a combination of performances by top artists, the UCF Jazz Ensemble 1, the UCF All-Star High School Jazztet, a national honors-combo featuring top high school jazz students, and appearances by some of the top high school bands in the State of Florida as part of a second-day clinic.

Guest Artists

Over the six years of the two-day festival, it has featured guest artists:

One for All
Charles McPherson
Mulgrew Miller
Terrell Stafford
Lenny Pickett
Lou Donaldson
Kevin Mahogany
Mike LeDonne
Dr. Lonnie Smith
Grant Stewart
Guisando Caliente
Antonio Hart
Michael Philip Mossman
Catherine Russell
David Hazeltine

References

University of Central Florida
Jazz festivals in the United States
Music festivals in Orlando, Florida